Chauth Ka Barwara Tehsil is one of the seven Tehsils of Sawai Madhopur District, Rajasthan state, India

References

Sawai Madhopur district